Neochoraki (before 1928:  – ; Macedonian and) is a village in the Florina regional unit, Greece.

History

In 1873, Néokaza, at the time within the Lerin (Florina) kaza in Manastir Sanjak and Vilayet of the Ottoman Empire, was recorded as having 250 households and 630 male Bulgarian inhabitants.

In the early 20th century the British journalist Henry Noel Brailsford noted Neocazi as "a poor Bulgarian hamlet on the plain not far from Florina", burnt by the Turks during the Ilinden Uprising.

The Greek census (1920) recorded 486 people in the village and in 1923 there were 130 inhabitants (or 26 families) who were Muslim. Following the Greek-Turkish population exchange, in 1926 within Neokazi there were two refugee families from Asia Minor and 29 refugee families from the Caucasus. The Greek census (1928) recorded 585 village inhabitants. In 1928, there were 31 refugee families (117 people).

References

Populated places in Florina (regional unit)